The U.S. state of New York attempted bail reform, in an act that stood from January to June 2020. As part of the New York State Fiscal Year (SFY) Budget for 2019–2020, passed on April 1, 2019, cash bail was eliminated for most misdemeanor and non-violent felony charges, "including stalking, assault without serious injury, burglary, many drug offenses, and even some kinds of arson and robbery." The law went into effect on January 1, 2020. It was later narrowed after public pushback.

According to The New York Times, "While New Jersey, California, Illinois and other states have limited the use of bail, New York is one of the few states to abolish bail for many crimes without also giving state judges the discretion to consider whether a person poses a threat to public safety in deciding whether to hold them."

There was a surge of opposition from lawmakers, district attorneys, and police chiefs as the date of implementation of the bail reform law neared.

New York state judges reportedly started releasing criminal suspects in November 2019 due to the impending law implementation. It was estimated that 25,000 people would be released by the time the law took effect.

In the first full year after implementation of the law, there were approximately 100,000 cases where adults were released instead of being held in custody or assigned bail. In one-fifth of those cases a released individual sustained a new arrest while the initial case was pending, most of which were for misdemeanors and nonviolent felonies.  Individuals who were arrested again for violent felony charges accounted for two percent of those 100,000 cases, and fewer than one-half a percent of those released were arrested again for violent felony charges with a firearm.

Support
Supporters of the law have "hailed it as a landmark measure to stop the poor from being jailed before trial simply because they had few resources." They say "the new bail system will pay dividends by allowing people awaiting trial to remain in their homes with their families and jobs — all elements of maintaining stability in low-income communities." They say critics of the law are being alarmist.

Opposition and criticism
Prosecutors and law enforcement officials have criticized the law for taking away critical decision-making from judges, who no longer have "the discretion to set a higher bail for people with long arrest records" or have shown "other signs they might commit another crime." They also fear "some defendants released under the new rules will continue to commit crimes, and a few may try to intimidate potential witnesses."

Further criticism came after the Monsey Hanukkah stabbing, even though the bail reform law would not apply in that case.

Additional criticism came from communities impacted by a spate of anti-Semitic attacks in Brooklyn. One assailant, Tiffany Harris, was released without bail after attacking three Jewish women, and attacked another woman the next day. This and other attacks raised concerns that the new law put New Yorkers more at risk.

Following a spike in crime statistics in January 2020 and under sustained opposition, the bail reform was rolled back that month. Governor Andrew Cuomo signed legislation allowing judges to impose cash bail for more crimes and under more conditions (such as the defendant being on parole).

References

2019 in New York (state)
2020 in New York (state)
Bail in the United States
2019 in American law
2019 controversies in the United States
Bail reform
Criminal justice reform in the United States
bail reform